Maniani is a surname. Notable people with the surname include:

Mirela Maniani (born 1976), Albanian born in Greece thrower who has also represented Albania
Oktovianus Maniani (born 1990), Indonesian footballer

See also
Manini (disambiguation)